Ophiocara is a genus of fishes in the family Butidae native to tropical waters of Indo-Pacific.

Species
The recognized species in this genus are:
 Ophiocara macrolepidota (Bloch, 1792)
 Ophiocara porocephala (Valenciennes, 1837) (northern mud gudgeon)

References

Butidae